"Get Up" is the second single from the album Dress Me Slowly by Australian rock band You Am I. It was released in 2001 and reached number 44 on the Australian national chart and number 57 in that year's Hottest 100.

Track listing
 "Get Up" – 3:12
 "Older Guys" – 3:47
 "Tourism" – 3:31
 "Be Prepared" – 4:05
 "Damage" – 3:27

"Older Guys", "Tourism", "Be Prepared" and "Damage" are all You Am I originals (Rogers). "Older Guys" was initially recorded for Dress Me Slowly but was left off to make way for newer songs, while "Tourism" is a demo recording of an otherwise unreleased song. "Be Prepared" is a solo Tim Rogers song. "Damage" is the same as the album and single version.

Charts

References

2001 singles
You Am I songs
Songs written by Tim Rogers (musician)
2001 songs